The 1982 United States Senate election in West Virginia took place on November 7, 1982. Incumbent Democratic U.S. Senator Robert Byrd won re-election to a fifth term.

Candidates

Democratic 
Robert Byrd, incumbent U.S. Senator

Republican 
Cleve Benedict, U.S. Congressman first elected in 1980

Campaign 
Benedict, a freshman congressman, made great note of Byrd's record of high office in the Ku Klux Klan, his avoidance of service in World War II, and the fact that Byrd, then alone among members of Congress, owned no home in the state he represented. His campaign represented the last serious and well-funded effort to unseat Byrd, spending $1,098,218. Byrd was Minority Leader at the time.

Results

See also 
 1982 United States Senate elections

References 

West Virginia
1982
1982 West Virginia elections
Robert Byrd